Wisinto of Kremsmünster (died c. 1250) was an Austrian Benedictine priest, monk, and holy figure. Little is known of his life other than the fact that he served at Kremsmünster Abbey. Austrian Benedictines refer to him as Saint Wisinto; elsewhere, however, he is known as Blessed. His feast day is 31 December.

References
Patron Saints Index page

13th-century deaths
Austrian Roman Catholic priests
Austrian Benedictines
Austrian Roman Catholic saints
13th-century Christian saints
Year of birth unknown
1250s deaths
13th-century Roman Catholic priests